Prothyma is a genus of beetles in the family Cicindelidae, containing the following species:

 Prothyma annamica Deuve, 2002
 Prothyma assamensis Rivalier, 1964
 Prothyma banksi W.Horn, 1923
 Prothyma bidentilabris W.Horn, 1934
 Prothyma birmanica Rivalier, 1964
 Prothyma bordonii Cassola, 1980
 Prothyma bottegoi (W.Horn, 1897)
 Prothyma bouvieri (W.Horn, 1896)
 Prothyma cassolai Naviaux, 1991
 Prothyma coerulea W.Horn, 1920
 Prothyma concinna (Dejean, 1831)
 Prothyma confusa G.Muller, 1939
 Prothyma discretepunctata W.Horn, 1924
 Prothyma erythropyga (Putzeys, 1880)
 Prothyma exornata Schmidt-Goebel, 1846
 Prothyma fallaciosa Rivalier, 1964
 Prothyma guttipennis Boheman, 1848
 Prothyma henningi W.Horn, 1898
 Prothyma heteromalla (W.S.MacLeay, 1825)
 Prothyma heteromallicollis W.Horn, 1909
 Prothyma hopkinsi W.Horn, 1909
 Prothyma incerata Rivalier, 1964
 Prothyma laophila Deuve, 2002
 Prothyma leprieurii (Dejean, 1831)
 Prothyma lucidicollis (Chaudoir, 1869)
 Prothyma methneri W.Horn, 1921
 Prothyma nitida Rivalier, 1964
 Prothyma ornata Naviaux, 1989
 Prothyma proxima (Chaudoir, 1860)
 Prothyma quadriguttata (Quensel in Schoenherr, 1806)
 Prothyma quadripustulata Boheman, 1848
 Prothyma radama Kunckel dHerculais in Grandidier, 1887
 Prothyma rapillyi Naviaux, 1989
 Prothyma reconciliatrix (W.Horn, 1900)
 Prothyma schmidtgoebeli (W.Horn, 1895)
 Prothyma schultzei W.Horn, 1908
 Prothyma scrobiculata (Wiedemann, 1823)
 Prothyma shancola Sawada & Wiesner, 1998
 Prothyma tenuipenis W.Horn, 1934
 Prothyma vientianensis Sawada & Wiesner, 1996
 Prothyma werneri (Sawada & Wiesner, 1998)

References

Cicindelidae